Dead Along The Way is a 2016 Irish crime comedy film, directed by Maurice O'Carroll, and produced by Sinead O' Riordan.

Production

The film tells the story of two wedding videographers who find themselves unexpectedly dealing with a dead body, overly-enthusiastic Gardaí, fertility treatment,a vengeful gangster and an imminent wedding. The film was shot in Laois and Dublin. The film is a co-production between ORion Productions and Burnt Ice Pictures.

Plot

Wacker and Tony – a pair of down-on-their-luck videographers – are about to video a wedding, and they think their lives can’t get any worse. Wacker’s wife has chucked him out, he has been beaten up over money she borrowed for fertility treatment, and a drink-fueled incident the night before has put his friendship with Tony under huge strain. But their problems are only beginning: Big Jim – a notorious loan shark who is also having a pretty bad time of it after learning about his 16-year-old daughter’s pregnancy – visits the church and dies after a scuffle with Tony. The videographers decide to try and conceal their crime before any wedding guests arrive. What happens next is ungodly.

Cast

 Niall Murphy as Wacker McGrath
 Ciaran Bermingham as Tony
 Tom Lawlor as Big Jim 
 Ben Condron as Chopper 
 Sinead O' Riordan as Garda McGuirk
 Donna Patrice as Aoife 
 Kevin McCormack as Garda O' Neill
 Gail Brady as Sarah 
 Tara Downes as Joy
 Johnny Elliott as Ozzie O' Brien

Release

Dead Along The Way premiered at the Galway Film Fleadh on 6 July 2016, and was one of the first independent Irish films that sold out within hours. It then went on to open the Indie Cork Film Festival in October 2016. Following fast in the footsteps of the Galway Film Fleadh, the screening instantly sold out and was moved to a larger screen to accommodate the demand for tickets.
The film won best independent feature at the Underground Cinema Film Festival in Dún Laoghaire and then announced a limited theatrical release where it had its theatrical premiere in the Gate Cinema in  Cork City. Donald Clarke" of "The Irish Times commented saying the film was "A dead ringer for tarantino, in a good way." In March 2017, "Dead Along The Way'' will have its United States Premiere at the Chicago International Film Festival.

References

External links 
http://www.orionproductions.org
 

2016 films
Irish crime comedy films
2010s crime comedy films
Films directed by Maurice O'Carroll
Films about weddings
Films set in Ireland
English-language Irish films
2010s English-language films